The 1966 Federation Cup was the fourth edition of what is now known as the Fed Cup. 21 nations participated in the tournament, which was held at the Turin Press Sporting Club in Turin, Italy from 10–15 May. United States won their second title, defeating West Germany in the final, in what was the first final not featuring Australia.

Participating teams

Draw
All ties were played at the Turin Press Sporting Club in Turin, Italy on clay courts.

First round
Sweden vs. Morocco

Hungary vs. Belgium

Bulgaria vs. Canada

Rhodesia vs. Austria

Second round
United States vs. Sweden

France vs. Hungary

Great Britain vs. Canada

Czechoslovakia vs. Poland

Italy vs. Rhodesia

Argentina vs. West Germany

Netherlands vs. South Africa

Switzerland vs. Australia

Quarterfinals
United States vs. France

Great Britain vs. Czechoslovakia

Italy vs. West Germany

Netherlands vs. Australia

Semifinals
United States vs. Great Britain

West Germany v Australia

Final
United States vs. West Germany

References

Billie Jean King Cups by year
Federation Cup
Federation Cup
Federation Cup
Federation Cup
Federation Cup
Federation Cup
Federation Cup